The cuisine of the Caucasus refers to the cuisine of Armenia, Azerbaijan, Georgia and North Caucasus.

Traditional dishes

Plates

Some popular cheeses from the Caucasus include:
 Ashvlagwan (Ашвлагуан) — Abkhaz smoked cheese, similar to sulguni.
 Chechil (Չեչիլ) — String (often smoked) cheese, made in Armenia.
 Chechili (ჩეჩილი) — Cheese in shape of ropes, made in south Georgia.
 Adyga kwae — (Адыгэ Къуае) - Mild cheese, made in Circassia.
 Chkinti' (ჭყინტი) - Salty and "juicy" cheese made originally in Imereti.
 Dambalkhacho (დამბალხაჭო) — "Rotten" cheese made in Pshavi and Mtiuleti.
 Guda (გუდა) — Cheese made from sheep milk in Tusheti. Its preparation takes 20 days.

 Iron tsykht (Ирон Цыхт) — Cheese made in Ossetia.
 Qatik — Sour creamy cheese, made in Azerbaijan.
 Sulguni (სულგუნი) — One of the most famous cheeses from Mingrelia, made from cow or buffalo milk.
 To-beram (ТIо-берам) — Cottage cheese mixed with sour cream, made traditionally in Chechnya and in Ingushetia.

Dough

 Achma (აჩმა / Ачма) — Fluffy pastry with cheese, traditionally made in Georgia, especially in Abkhazia.
 Afar (Афарар) — Lezgian flatbread stuffed with various fillings, mostly meat or cottage cheese.
 Chepalgash (ЧIепалгаш) — Chechen and Ingush pie filled with cottage cheese and wild garlic.
 Chudu (Чуду) — Sort of pie, made in Dagestan with various fillings (meat, cheese, cottage cheese, herbs, etc).
 Dalnash (Далнаш) — Chechen and Ingush pie filled with lard and wild garlic.
 Haliva (Хьэлжъо) — Circassian triangular fried pie, often filled with Circassian cheese and potatoes.
 Hingalsh (Хингалш) — Chechen and Ingush pie with a half-round shape, filled with pumpkin.

 Kubdari (კუბდარი) — Svan pie filled with spicy meat.
 Khachapuri (ხაჭაპური) — Georgian pie filled with cheese. This dish has a lot of regional variation, the most famous being Adjaruli Khachapuri, shaped in a form of a boat.
Khichin (Хычин) — Balkar and Karachay pie filled with various stuffing.
 Ossetian Pies — Davondzhin (filled with a mixture of Ossetian cheese and wild garlic leaves / Kabuskadzhin (filled with cabbage and cheese) / Kartofdzhin (filled with potato and cheese) / Nasdzhin (filled with mashed pumpkin) / Khabizdzhin (filled with cheese and potato) / Artadzhikhon (filled with cheese) / Fidzhin (filled with minced meat) / Kh'adurdzhin (filled with kidney beans) / Tsakharadzhin (filled with beetroot and cheese).
 Qutab — Azerbaijani cooked dough filled with meat or pumpkin.
 Zhingyalov hats (Ժենգյալով հաց) — Armenian flatbread stuffed with diced herbs and vegetables such as spinach.

Starters and snacks

 Ajapsandali (აჯაფსანდალი / Աջափսանդալ / Əcəbsəndəl) — Cold starter containing aubergines, potatoes and spices. It is traditionally made in Georgia, Armenia and in Azerbaijan.
 Basturma (Բաստուրմա / Basdırma) — Seasoned and air-dried cured beef.
 Choban salad (Çoban) — Azerbaijani salad made from tomatoes and cucumbers.
 Dolma / Tolma (Dolma / Տոլմա / Tolma / Долма) — Vegetable (cabbage, zucchini, grape leaf, aubergine, pepper) stuffed with minced meat and rice, mostly made in Armenia and Azerbaijan.
 Kupati (კუპატი)  Sausage made in Western Georgia.
 Lobio (ლობიო) — Cooked minced beans with addition of coriander, walnuts, garlic and onion.
 Nigvziani Badrijani (ნიგვზიანი ბადრიჯანი) — Fried aubergine with walnut sauce and pomegranate seeds.
 Pkhali (ფხალი) — Minced vegetables (cabbage, beet, aubergine) with pomegranate seeds.
 Sujuk (Սուջուխ / Sucuk) — Dry and spicy sausage, mostly made in Armenia and Azerbaijan.

Soups

 Bugleme (Буглеме) — Meat stew, served by the Mountain Jews.
 Chakapuli (ჩაქაფული) — Stew made of lamb or beef (or veal), tarragon and cherry plums in Eastern Georgia (Kakheti and Kartli).
 Chakhokhbili (ჩახოხბილი) — Soup made of tomatoes and poultry meat (mostly chicken or turkey) which originated in Western Georgia.
 Chikhirtma (ჩიხირთმა) — Soup made of turkey or chicken meat and eggs which is traditionally made in Kakheti.
 Dovga (Dovğа) — Soup made of yoghurt and fresh herbs, traditionally made in Azerbaijan.
 Kharcho (ხარჩო) — Soup made of beef, rice, cherry plums and walnuts from Mingrelia.

 Khash (խաշ, Xaş, ხაში) — beef or lamb feet in its broth with garlic. It is eaten throughout the Transcaucasia.
 Piti — Azerbaijani soup made with mutton and vegetables.
 Chorba — Types of soup usually made with lamb and beef, fried vegetables and herbs which is made in every country in Caucasus, especially in Dagestan and Azerbaijan.
 Spas (Սպաս) — Armenian soup made with matzoon.
 Tarhana (Թարխանա) — Soup made with matzoon and flour.

Main courses

 Apkhazura (აფხაზურა) - Fried meat enrolled in caul fat, traditionally made in Abkhazia.
 Amcheg (Амчег) - Lezgin roasted turkey.
 Balıq - Azerbaijani grilled fish (commonly sturgeon) with sour-cream sauce.
 Barsh (БӀарш) - Chechen and Ingush dish, consisting of a mutton stomach stuffed with minced meat.
 Chanakhi (ჩანახი) - Georgian tomato-based stew with spiced lamb, potatoes, aubergines.

 Tabaka Qatami (ტაბაკა ქათამი) - Georgian roasted chicken with adjika, traditionally made in Mingrelia.
 Dzhed (Джед) - Circassian chicken in a sauce, similar to satsivi.
 Dushbara (Düşbərə) - Azerbaijani dumplings served with mutton and vegetables in its broth.
 Jijig-Galnash (Жижиг-Галнаш) - Galnash (boiled dough) with meat and its broth.
 Ghapama (Ղափամա) - Armenian baked pumpkin with rice, dried fruits and honey inside.
 Holtmash (ХьолтӀмаш) - Chechen and Ingush dumplings made from cornmeal stuffed with nettles.
 Kchuch (Կճուճ) Armenian dish made of mixed vegetables and meat and fish.
 Khali-Nukun (ХIали-Нукьун) - Dargin dish consisting of a fat-tailed lards with oatmeal.

 Hinkal (Хинкал) - Dagestani boiled dough, eaten with lamb or beef.
 Khinkali (ხინკალი) - Georgian dumpling stuffed with meat, vegetables or cottage cheese.
 Khoyagusht (Хоягушт) - Meat pie from the cuisine of Mountain Jews, Made of eggs, turmeric, slow cooked meat (usually sheep or goat) and its broth.
 Kofta (Küftə / Քուֆթա / გუფთა) - Spiced meatballs, made in Transcaucasia.
 Kuchmachi (კუჭმაჭი) - Fried chicken livers with pomegranate seeds.
 Kurze (Курзе) - Long shaped dumplings stuffed with meat, popular among Dagestanis.
 Mataz (Мэтазэ) - Circassian dumplings stuffed with various fillings (meat, cottage cheese, potato).
 Lahmajun (Լահմաջու) - Flatbread topped with minced meat. Made in Armenia and Turkey.

 Lavangi (Ləvəngi) - Azerbaijani baked chicken or fish stuffed with walnuts and spices.
 Libzhe (Либжэ) - Circassian stew made of beef, similar to goulash.
 Lula kebab (Lülə Kabab) - Azerbaijani kebab made from minced meat (often enrolled in lavash).
 Manti ( մանթի / Манты / Мантиш) - Dumplings, brought by Turks which is commonly made in Southern Caucasus.
 Plov (Plov / Փլավ / ფლავი / Плов) - Rice dish, mostly cooked with meat and vegetables.
 Qovurma - Azerbaijani lamb stew.
 Satsivi (საცივი) - Georgian poultry meat (turkey or chicken based dish with walnuts.
 Shashlik / Mtsvadi / Khorovats - Cooked meat on fire, made in all Caucasus.
 Tjvjik (տժվժիկ) - Armenian fried offal dish.
 Yokh (Йоьхь) - Chechen and Ingush spicy sausage from mutton and flour.

Condiments and sauces

 Ajika (აჯიკა / Аџьыка) — Hot and spicy paste made from peppers, garlic, herbs, spices, walnuts and salt. It originated in Western Georgia, in the regions of Mingrelia and Abkhazia but used in all Caucasus.
 Matzoon (Մածուն / მაწონი) — Fermented milk, similar to yoghurt, eaten in Armenia and Georgia.
 Narsharab — pomegranate molasses, made and used in Azerbaijan.
 Bazhe (ბაჟე) — walnut sauce with spices.
 Tkemali (ტყემალი) — cherry plums sauce.
 Urbech (Урбеч) - Urbech is a traditional Dagestan paste of ground seeds or nuts.

Breads

 Choereg (Ցուրեկի) — Braided bread made for Easter.
 Matnakash (Մատնաքաշ) — Armenian bread made with wheat flour and tea.
 Lavash (Լավաշ / ლავაში / Lavaş) — Flatbread made in tandoor which is quite popular in the South Caucasus. The origin is uncertain.
 Mchadi (მჭადი) — Fried bread made from cornmeal.
 Shotis puri (შოთის პური) — Bread shaped like a canoe.
 Siskal (Сискал) — Fried bread made from polenta in Ingushetia and Chechnya.
 Tonis puri (თონის პური) — Popular Georgian bread baked in a traditional tone.

Desserts

 Alani (Ալանի) — Armenian sweet made from dried apricot stuffed with ground walnut and sugar.
 Baldzhin (Балджын) — Ossetian sweet pie filled with cherries.

 Churchkhela (ჩურჩხელა) — Georgian sweet made from mixed grape juice and flour with chopped walnuts or hazelnuts.
 Gata (Գաթա) — Armenian pastry / sweet bread.
 Gozinaki (გოზინაყი) — Sweet made by Georgians for New Year consisting of chopped walnuts and honey.
 Gvaymakkhsh (Гваймакхш) — Chechen / Ingush pancakes with honey.
 Halva (Halva / Հալվա / ჰალვა / Хьовла / Халва) — Sweet made from flour. The origin is Azerbaijan.
 Harbiz Fo (Хьарбиз фо) — Circassian watermelon honey.
 Mikado cake chocolate cake from Armeniamade with condensed milk
Murabba (Mürəbbə / Մուրաբա / მურაბა) — Jam made traditionally in Transcaucasia with local fruits such as cherry, strawberry, raspberry, apricot, fig, watermelon, etc, but also from walnuts.
 Natyoukh (НатIюхI) — Lak candy made with a mixture of honey and sugar with apricot kernels and walnuts.
 Pakhlava (Paxlava / Փախլավա / ფახლავა) — Sweet pastry made with filo layers. It is made in the Transcaucasian countries.
 Pastegh (Պաստեղ) — Dried fruit.
 Pelamushi (ფელამუში) — Kakhetian traditional candy made from grape juice and flour.
 Shekerbura (Şəkərbura) — Azerbaijani sweet pastry filled with almonds, walnuts or hazelnuts. It is consumed during Nowruz, the Zoroastrian New Year.

Beverages

Alcoholic
 Arak (Арахъ) — Ossetian vodka made from cereals such as corn or barley. However, some are made with fruits especially by the Ossetians of Georgia.
 Ararat (Հայկական կոնյակ) — Famous Armenian brandy made from white grapes and spring water.
 Armenian wines (Հայկական գինիներ) — Most famous include : Voski, Karasi, Yeraz.
 Boza — Type of sweet and sour beer with little degree of alcohol, made from cooked wheat and barley flour. It is primarily consumed in Azerbaijan.
 Bagany (Бæгæны) — Ossetian beer made from wheat, barley and maize.
 Chacha (ჭაჭა) — Georgian vodka made from pomace (grape) or other fruits which is often homemade.
 Georgian wines (ქართული ღვინოები) — Most famous include : Saperavi, Tsinandali, Akasheni, Kindzmarauli, Kvanchkara, Lykhny (made in Abkhazia), etc. Most of the wines are made in the region of Kakheti.
 Makhsima (Мэхъсымэ) — Circassian alcohol made from corn flour and wheat. Similar to boza but has higher alcohol content.

Non-alcoholic

 Ayran / Tan (Ayran / Թան) — Yogurt-based salty beverage, popular in Armenia, Azerbaijan and the North Caucasus.
 Borjomi (ბორჯომი) — Carbonated mineral water from the Borjomi Gorge.
 Jermuk (Ջերմուկ) — Mineral water from Jermuk (Armenia).
 Kampot (Компот) — Very sweet beverage made from local fruits which is often homemade. Made in Azerbaijan.
 Lagidzis Tsklebi (ლაღიძის წყლები) — Fruit- or chocolate-infused water, often sold in streets.
 Nogai Tea (Ногай Шай) — Salty tea brought in Northern Caucasus by the Nogais (Popular among the Dagestanis).
 Sharbat (Şerbet) — Azerbaijani refreshing beverage made from herbs (such as mint) or fruits.
 Tach (ТӀач) — Lak kissel made from cereals.
 Tarkhuna (ტარხუნა) — Georgian lemonade with tarragon flavour.
 Tea (Çay / Թեյ / ჩაი / Чай / Цай) — Tea is an important beverage in the Caucasus and is cultivated mostly in Azerbaijan and on the Georgian coast. (Black tea is the most popular variety of tea in the region.)

Gallery

See also
 Armenian cuisine
 Azerbaijani cuisine
 Georgian cuisine
 Soviet cuisine
 History of the Caucasus
 Peoples of the Caucasus

References

Further reading

 
 Sami Zubaida, Richard Tapper. A Taste of Thyme: Culinary Cultures of the Middle East (2nd ed.). London & New York: Tauris Parke Paperbacks. .
 В. В. Похлебкин. Национальные кухни наших народов. Москва: Пищевая промышленность , 1980.  (William Pokhlyobkin, Ethnic Cuisines of our Peoples. Moscow: Soviet Food Industry publishing house, 1980).

Dishes from the Caucasus
Dishes from the Caucasus
 
Cuisine by region
Asian cuisine
European cuisine